Tail Gunner Joe is a 1977 television movie dramatizing the life of U.S. Senator Joseph R. McCarthy, a Wisconsin Republican who claimed knowledge of communist infiltration of the U.S. government during the 1950s. The film was broadcast on NBC-TV.  It was nominated for six Emmy awards and won two: best writing and best supporting actor for Burgess Meredith's portrayal of attorney Joseph N. Welch. It starred Peter Boyle (as McCarthy) and John Forsythe. Robert F. Simon appeared as journalist Drew Pearson.

The nickname 'Tail Gunner Joe' is a derisive term for the Senator that originated from his false claim to have been a tail gunner on American bombers during World War II.

Cast
Peter Boyle as Senator Joseph McCarthy
Burgess Meredith as Joseph N. Welch
John Forsythe as Paul Cunningham
Jean Stapleton as Mrs. DeCamp
Robert F. Simon as Drew Pearson
Robert Symonds as President Truman
Andrew Duggan as President Eisenhower
Wesley Addy as Middleton
Addison Powell as General George C. Marshall
William Schallert as General Zwicker
Ned Beatty as Sylvester
Henry Jones as Armitage
George Wyner as Roy Cohn
Philip Abbott as Senator Scott W. Lucas
Patricia Neal as Senator Margaret Chase Smith
Howard Hesseman as Lt. Ted Cantwell
John Carradine as Wisconsin farmer

Reception
John Carmody wrote in The Washington Post:The story makes the unassailable point that McCarthy, who chased Communists around for years without  actually catching one, wouldn't have been "successful" if the media and a lot of politicians, including President Truman and Eisenhower, hadn't tolerated him.<p>There is a certain hand-wringing quality to some of the narration Sunday night (scriptwriters long to be on the side of the angels, too) and there is a little side-stepping when it comes to explaining the sources of McCarthy's political strengths, such as they were.

From a review by ModCinema:Tail Gunner Joe is in its own way as biased and unfair as any of Joe McCarthy's diatribes but this made-for-TV movie works as a brisk, entertaining recollection of an era in which "guilt by association" was a byword. As Joe McCarthy, Peter Boyle's performance is so convincing that it borders on the supernatural.

References

External links
 
 
 

American biographical films
Films about McCarthyism
Universal Pictures films
1977 television films
1977 films
Emmy Award-winning programs
NBC network original films
Films directed by Jud Taylor
Cultural depictions of Joseph McCarthy
Films about Richard Nixon
Films set in the 1950s
1970s American films